Unionist Party may refer to:

United Kingdom
 Conservative and Unionist Party, the formal name of the Conservative Party
 Liberal Unionist Party, existed from 1886 to 1912
Unionist government, 1895–1905, a coalition government of the two parties

Northern Ireland

Current organisations
Democratic Unionist Party (DUP), the larger of the two main unionist political parties in Northern Ireland
Ulster Unionist Party (UUP), the smaller and more moderate of the two main unionist political parties in Northern Ireland
Progressive Unionist Party (PUP), minor loyalist party formed in 1979
Traditional Unionist Voice (TUV), minor loyalist party formed in 2007
Ulster Unionist Labour Association (or Labour Unionist Party)

Defunct organisations
Protestant Unionist Party, former political party formed by Ian Paisley in 1966 out of the Ulster Protestant Action (UPA) movement
Independent Unionist Association (or Independent Unionist Party), existed from 1937 to late 1940s
Vanguard Unionist Progressive Party (Ulster Vanguard), existed from 1973 and 1978
Unionist Party of Northern Ireland, existed from 1974 and 1981
United Ulster Unionist Party, existed from 1975 and 1982, splinted from the Vanguard Progressive Unionist Party due to a disagreement over power-sharing
Ulster Popular Unionist Party, existed from 1980 to 1995
UK Unionist Party, existed 1995 to 2008
Northern Ireland Unionist Party, existed 1999 to 2008

Scotland
Unionist Party (Scotland), centre-right party which existed between 1912 and 1965, the dominant force in Scottish politics until the late 1950s
Scottish Conservative and Unionist Party, the full name of the party since 1965 more often called the Scottish Conservative Party
Scottish Unionist Party (1986), Scottish minor party of traditionalist Unionists disillusioned with the Conservative government's signing of the Anglo-Irish Agreement

India (under British rule)
 Unionist Party (Punjab), a major political party in the former Punjab Province until 1947

Canada
Unionist Party (Canada), existed from 1917 to 1920
Unionest Party

Croatia
Unionist Party (Kingdom of Croatia), existed from 1861 to 1918

Denmark

Faroe Islands
Union Party (Faroe Islands)

Greenland
Unionist Party (Greenland)

Egypt
National Progressive Unionist Party

Guatemala
Unionist Party (Guatemala, 1920)
Unionist Party (Guatemala)

Nicaragua
Central American Unionist Party

South Africa
Unionist Party (South Africa)

Thailand
Sahaphum Party ("Unionist Party" in English)

Tunisia
Unionist Democratic Union

United States
Unionist Party (United States)

See also
Unionism (disambiguation)
Unionist (disambiguation)
Separatism

Political party disambiguation pages